Jack Robert Skeen (23 December 1928 – 28 September 2001) was a New Zealand rugby union player. A flanker, Skeen represented Auckland at a provincial level, captaining the side from 1954 to 1957. He played just one match the New Zealand national side, the All Blacks, a test against the touring Australian team at Wellington in 1952.

References

1928 births
2001 deaths
Rugby union players from Auckland
People educated at Sacred Heart College, Auckland
New Zealand rugby union players
New Zealand international rugby union players
Auckland rugby union players
Rugby union flankers